Rock of the '70s is a Yes DVD released by Voiceprint on December 15, 2009. It contains Belgian promo material from September 1970. The music videos are synced with audio from the Time and a Word album. Peter Banks left the band before the album promo was shot. His replacement, Steve Howe, appears in this video. Brief interviews with band members are shown between each music video.

Track listing

Astral Traveller 5:55
Everydays 6:25
Then 5:47
No Opportunity Necessary, No Experience Needed 4:49
Sweet Dreams (Credits) 3:46

Personnel

Jon Anderson - Vocals
Peter Banks - Guitar (audio only)
Bill Bruford - Drums
Steve Howe - Guitar (footage only)
Tony Kaye - Keyboards
Chris Squire - Bass

Note: In the music video for "Then", Kaye and Squire switch instruments.

References 

Yes (band) video albums
2009 video albums